Kusaka (written: 日下 or 草鹿) is a Japanese surname. Notable people with the surname include:

 (born 1978), Japanese voice actress
, Japanese manga artist
 (1888–1972), Imperial Japanese Navy admiral
Maryanne Kusaka (born 1935), American politician
 (1893–1971), Imperial Japanese Navy admiral
, Japanese actor
 (born 1931), Japanese actor and voice actor

See also
, train station in Hidaka, Takaoka District, Kōchi Prefecture, Japan
7421 Kusaka, main-belt asteroid

Japanese-language surnames